The legislative districts of Maguindanao were the representations of the province of Maguindanao and the independent component city of Cotabato in the various national legislatures of the Philippines. The province and the city were represented in the lower house of the Congress of the Philippines through their first and second congressional districts from 1987–2022.

History 

Prior to gaining separate representation, areas now under the jurisdiction of Maguindanao were represented under the Department of Mindanao and Sulu (1917–1935) and Cotabato (1935–1972).

The enactment of Presidential Decree No. 341 on November 22, 1973, created the Province of Maguindanao out of Cotabato's Maguindanao-majority municipalities. The new province was represented in the Interim Batasang Pambansa as part of Region XII from 1978 to 1984.

Maguindanao (including Cotabato City) first gained separate representation in 1984, when it returned two representatives, elected at large, to the Regular Batasang Pambansa.

Under the new Constitution which was proclaimed on February 11, 1987, the province, including Cotabato City, was reapportioned into two congressional districts; each elected its member to the restored House of Representatives starting that same year.

The province of Shariff Kabunsuan, established with the passage of Muslim Mindanao Autonomy Act No. 201 and its subsequent approval by plebiscite, was created out of Maguindanao's western municipalities in 2006. Per Section 5 of MMA Act No. 201, Cotabato City was grouped with Shariff Kabunsuan for the purpose of electing a congressional representative. It was this specific provision that became the subject of the Supreme Court case that ultimately voided MMA Act No. 201 for being unconstitutional, and leading to the disestablishment of the Shariff Kabunsuan in 2008 and the return of its territory to Maguindanao. In the brief period of Shariff Kabunsuan's existence the First District of Maguindanao—Cotabato City was known as the Lone District of Shariff Kabunsuan—Cotabato City, while the Second District was known as the Lone District of Maguindanao.

The districts were dissolved in 2022 following the division of Maguindanao and replaced by Maguindanao del Norte's at-large congressional district and Maguindanao del Sur's at-large congressional district

1st District (defunct) 
City: Cotabato City
Municipalities: Barira, Buldon, Datu Odin Sinuat (Dinaig), Kabuntalan, Matanog, Parang, Sultan Kudarat, Upi, Sultan Mastura (established 2003), Datu Blah T. Sinsuat (established 2006), Northern Kabuntalan (established 2006)
Population (2020):  926,037

Notes

2nd District (defunct) 
Municipalities: Ampatuan, Buluan, Datu Paglas, Datu Piang, Pagalungan, Shariff Aguak, South Upi, Sultan sa Barongis, Talayan, General S. K. Pendatun (established 1991), Mamasapano (established 1998), Sultan Sumagka (Talitay) (established 1999), Datu Montawal (Pagagawan) (established 2000), Paglat (established 2001), Guindulungan (established 2003), Datu Saudi-Ampatuan (established 2003), Datu Unsay (established 2003), Datu Abdullah Sangki (established 2004), Rajah Buayan (established 2004), Pandag (established 2006), Mangudadatu (established 2006), Datu Anggal Midtimbang (established 2006), Datu Hoffer Ampatuan (established 2009), Datu Salibo (established 2009), Shariff Saydona Mustapha (established 2009)
Population (2020):  741,221

Notes

At-large (defunct) 

Notes

See also 
Maguindanao del Norte's at-large congressional district
Maguindanao del Sur's at-large congressional district
Legislative district of Mindanao and Sulu
Legislative district of Cotabato

References 

Maguindanao